Adapted physical education  is the art and science of developing, implementing, and monitoring a carefully designed physical education. Instructional program for a learner with a disability, based on a comprehensive assessment, to give the learner the skills necessary for a lifetime of rich leisure, recreation, and sport experiences to enhance physical fitness and wellness. Principles and Methods of Adapted Physical Education and Recreation.Adapted physical education generally refers to school-based programs for students ages 3–21yrs.

Federal law mandates that physical education be provided to students with disabilities. Physical Education is defined as the development of physical and motor skills, fundamental motor skills and patterns, skills in aquatics, dance and individual and group games and sports; including intramural and lifetime sports. Adapted Physical Education National Standards - What is Adapted Physical Education?

Adapted Physical Education National Standards (APENS)

The Adapted Physical Education National Standards promotes qualified, nationally certified educators to provide physical education services to students with disabilities.

European Standards of Adapted Physical Activity (EUSAPA)

The European Standards of Adapted Physical Activity has a set of standards for adapted physical education. They were revised to consider teaching adapted physical activity remotely.

Key legislation

Education of all Handicapped Children Act of 1975 (P.L. 94–142)
The history of Adapted Physical Education began with the implementation of P.L. 94–142 in 1975. This act recognized physical education as a direct service. Specially designed physical education programs must be made available to every disabled child receiving a Free, Appropriate Public Education (FAPE).

Americans with Disabilities Act (P.L. 101–336)
The Americans with Disabilities Act (ADA) was enacted in 1990 to prohibit the discrimination of individuals with disabilities in the public and private sectors. The ADA outlaws discrimination against a person with a disability in five spheres: employment, public services, transportation, public accommodations, and telecommunications.  ADA requires accessibility in physical education facilities.  Examples include: Weight rooms that accommodate wheelchair users, gym lockers that use combination locks, playgrounds surrounded by a fence, and well lighted gymnasiums to aid students with visual impairments.

Individuals with Disabilities Education Act (IDEA) 
Enacted in 1990 (and reauthorized in 1997 and 2004), IDEA was the reauthorization of PL 94–142 and continued the emphasis upon FAPE, IEP, LRE, and physical education as a direct educational service. With this reauthorization, person-first terminology was instituted, and emphasis was placed on the education of students with disabilities within the general curriculum and parent involvement in educational programming. Under Federal Law, in order to qualify for this special education programming, students must fall within one of the thirteen disability categories identified under IDEA and demonstrate an academic need.

Individualized Education Program or IEP 
An Individualized Educational Program (IEP) can be defined as a plan for each student, ages 3 to 21, who qualifies for special education services, based on an evaluation. All IEP's are outcome-oriented giving assurance that the student will benefit from special education and have real opportunities, full participation, independent living, and economic self-efficiency. If a student is receiving adapted physical education services, it must be identified on the IEP and APE goals should be developed and implemented. IEPs are revised once a year by an IEP team. Individuals with an IEP should receive a reevaluation every three years. IEP's are developed by the IEP team and based on comprehensive assessment as outlined by guidelines established in IDEA.

Purpose 
Federal law mandates that each student receiving special education and related services must have an Individualized Education Program (IEP) developed for them.  An IEP must be designed and written specifically for one student, outlining individualized needs, and used to establish an appropriate educational placement. Some consider the IEP to be a "management" program to guide appropriate service delivery, which includes the area of physical education.  The IEP creates an opportunity for teachers, parents, school administrators, related services personnel and students (when appropriate) to work together to improve educational results for learners with disabilities.

Do all students with disabilities need an IEP for physical education? 
No, IDEA 2004 mandates each individual with a disability have an IEP developed if necessary to benefit their education. If an appropriate assessment is completed and the IEP team decides the student is not safe and/or successful in general physical education without supplementary aids and services, then an IEP is developed and services provided. A student can have IEP goals related to physical education needs regardless of their educational placement.

Placement options 
What is the relationship between placement and the IEP?
Decisions based on IDEA qualifications are generally discussed and determined during an Individual Education Program (IEP) meeting. IEP recommendations for services and supports must consider a student's unique needs, as well as the Least Restrictive Environment (LRE)." The LRE will be based upon the assessment process and where the IEP goals can best be met. There are a variety of placement option which should be considered including:
Full-time General PE (GPE)
General PE with a younger class
Part-time Adapted PE (GPE for some units or parts of a lesson)
Reverse Mainstreaming
Small Group or One on One PE
Separate School
Home/Hospital

IEP/IPEP 
IPEP stands for Individual Physical Education Program. It is a written document that parallels the IEP in form and content but is specific to physical education. Unlike the IEP, the IPEP is not a legal document. Instead, it is a summary of assessment data and needs of a student. An IPEP provides recommendations for placement, services, and the teaching and learning conditions that will be best suited for each student.

Section 504 Plan 
Section 504 of the Rehabilitation Act of 1973 protects the rights of individuals with disabilities in programs and activities that receive federal financial assistance, including federal funds. Section 504 provides that: "No otherwise qualified individual with a disability in the United States ... shall, solely by reason of her or his disability, be excluded from the participation in, be denied the benefits of, or be subjected to discrimination under any program or activity receiving Federal financial assistance...

What is the difference between an IEP and a Section 504 Plan? 
If a student has one of the thirteen disabilities identified by IDEA and demonstrates an educational need, special services are provided. These services are guided by the IEP.  Students who do not meet the qualifications for IDEA but still have a disability and require some assistance to be able to participate in physical education would be candidates for a Section 504 Plan. A Section 504 Plan spells out the modifications and accommodations that will be needed for these students to have an opportunity to perform at the same level as their peers (might include things like a wheelchair ramp, blood sugar monitoring, etc.).

Use of technology 
With the ever changing world of technology, there are plenty of new developments in physical education with new and improved technology. As an APE teacher it is crucial to stay up to date with the new technology. It is important to learn and implement the new technology to better help their students succeed in physical education. APE teachers first need to learn and understand the new and improved technology and find what way works the best for his or herself and the students to help them succeed in the best way possible. APE teachers can create a website for the class to upload anything and everything they will be doing throughout the school year to keep track of their progress and IEP goal attainment. The APE teacher can develop a fitness workout plan with videos and step by step instructions that the students can download and follow in the classroom or at home with a family member. APE teacher can help the students incorporate fitness apps into their daily life, there are new apps that are being used in physical education which are MyFitnessPal and MapMyFitness that track your exercise, help with your nutrition and calorie intake. Students can be taught how to keep track of their physical fitness, nutrition and their goals. These apps can also be used as report cards or IEP goal attainment because they have tracked their exercises. Teachers can easily create videos of students doing an activity and download them onto an iPod or computer so students have an easily accessible reference to use during transition periods or after they graduate. Video games are also starting to become more and more predominant in physical education classes, such games can be used outside of school as well. Some games are particularly accessible for individuals with disabilities including Wii and Eye Toy Play. There will always be new ways to enhance learning but ultimately it comes down to what gives the most success to the individual and the APE teacher. Technology is always changing everyday, APE teachers should stay up to date with the technology and find way to improve and enhance their students physical education and development as a person and athlete.

Teaching adapted physical education

Qualifications 
Qualifications vary by state. In order to be qualified an educator must have met their state's approved or recognized certification, licensing, registration, or other comparable requirements. While these vary by state, there are national standards set in place to allow somebody to become a Certified Adapted Physical Education Professional or CAPE. These requirements include
 A bachelor's degree in physical education or equivalent (sport science, kinesiology, etc.)
 A minimum of 200 hours of practicum experiences in adapted physical education
 Completion of a minimum of 9 credits of coursework from a related field
 A valid teaching certificate in physical education
 Take the APENS National Certification Exam
While certification will certainly help educators create well-developed adapted physical education programs, there are no requirements for local school districts to hire CAPE's.

Determining what to teach 
A physical education instructor will assess the needs of the students considering their employment opportunities and living arrangements after graduation. This will allow them to create an adapted physical education curriculum for students following the ABC planning process. The steps in this process are as follows.
 Define the student's curriculum goals.
 Delineate the objectives for each curriculum goal.
 Determine the emphasis each goal should receive in the curriculum.
 Calculate the amount of time available.
 Calculate the average objective mastery time.
 Determine how much content can fit in the curriculum.
 Sequence the goals and objectives developmentally.

Class format 
Class format is defined as the way in which members of the class are organized. There are seven class formats that are most commonly used in adapted physical education settings.
 One-to-one instruction: one teacher or assistant for every student.
 Small group: 3-10 students working together with a teacher or assistant.
 Large group: entire class participating together as a group.
 Mixed group: using various class formats within one class period.
 Peer teaching or tutoring: using classmates or students without disabilities from other classes for teaching and assisting students with disabilities.
 Teaching stations: several areas in which smaller subsets for the class rotate to practice skills.
 Self-paced independent work: each student works on individual goals at his or her own pace following directions on task cards or with guidance from the teacher or assistant.
Teachers must find the best class format to help the student achieve the goals for the lesson.

Teaching for specific disabilities

Intellectual Disabilities 
There are a number of general modifications that can be applied in a physical education environment for students with intellectual disabilities.

The first set of modifications deal with communication. When instructing students use shorter sentences, use gestures or demonstrations as supplement to verbal cues, repeat directions and have students repeat directions back to you, provide praise often, and give more feedback.

The next set of modifications deal with practice. Give students extra practice trials, build in more time for a student to master skills, make sure activities are perceived as fun, promote active participation, shorten activities to reduce problems with attention span, and allow choices in what activity will be done, when it will be done, where it will take place, and with whom the child will participate in the activity with. One method to structure activities is known as level teaching. To accommodate for students with varying levels of intellectual disabilities a game will be designed with different levels. For example, if the specific sport is volleyball the instructor will set up 3 courts with different modifications at each court to accommodate for these varying levels of disability. Court 1 may have a set of cones designating opposing sides while Court 3 has a net set in place. Different rules may be applied to different courts as well, allowing every student to be challenged in a constructive way.

The third set of modifications deal with curriculum. Adjust the general education curriculum to meet the needs of a student. For example, reduce the number of objectives that need to be mastered. If a student is severely delayed, an entirely new curriculum may need to be made. Activities may also need to provide early success which will encourage adherence.

The final set of modifications deal with the environment. It should be structured and visually appealing. It is essential to reduce playing areas in order to eliminate distractions. Plan to structure the environment in a way that will allow you to deal with behavioral problems.

Learning disabilities 
1 in 5 students with learning disabilities will also have motor impairments. There are a number of ways to accommodate these students.

Reduce class size: This allows teacher extra one on one time with students. Often a class of 20-30 students proves to be more effective than double or triple that in general physical education classes.

Use peer tutors: Peers can be rained in how to provide specific skill feedback as well as modify activities so the student has higher success. This can be effective when class size cannot be reduced.

Offer learning strategies: Both teachers and peer tutors can provide strategies to help disorganized learners focus. This includes provided picture cues, video cues, and additional cues such as footprints on the floor to help a student understand what and how to perform an activity.

Provide structured practice: Allow the student to get many practice opportunities. This will help them learn how to listen to and observe visual feedback for performance.

Identify success: Reframe success for students in a way that does not focus on the result. For example, using correct form in shooting should be a measure of success rather than making the basket.

Use a variety of senses when giving instructions: Some students do better listening to instruction while others do better watching a demonstration. Others may do best when physically guided into the pattern. By incorporating many types of learning styles, students will be more likely to succeed.

ADHD 
Students with attention-deficit/hyperactivity disorder may experience motor learning delays. Many strategies are available to minimize learning delays in students with ADHD.

Positive feedback: There is a relationship between positive feedback given by a physical education teacher and students applying corrective feedback.

Task sheets: A task sheet provides a progression of activities to be completed by the students and requires them to record their results. Task sheets can be turned in at the end of class. This allows students to assess their performance while acknowledging their need to improve their skills.

Token economy or point system: This is a structured agreement between the student and teacher in which the student earns rewards by meeting a minimum expectation. At the end of class both the student and teacher initial the points earned. At the end of the month, the student may earn a reward of his or her choice provided by the teacher.

Autism spectrum disorder 
Various strategies exist to allow students with autism to be successfully included in a physical education setting.

Preparing for inclusion: It is essential to know the students needs, abilities, and preferences. It is also important to prepare the student. The physical education environment may be anxiety inducing for them. Because of this, educators can slowly introduce the student to the environment. They may also preview the class using visual organizers to describe the setting the student will be a part of. They may also make visual schedules prior to class. It is also important to prepare the peers by teaching them what autism is and behaviors associated with it.

Instructing the student: There are a variety of methods for instructing students with autism. The first, environmental prompts. This involves the intentional use of equipment to encourage specific behaviors. The next is verbal prompts. This includes avoiding negative sentences. For example, instruction such as "step with your right leg" as opposed to "don't step with your left leg". Verbal prompts also include keeping phrases literal as well as provided concise instruction. It is also important to be consistent with language use. Peer tutors may also provide a lot of benefits for students in the physical education setting.

Deafness 
Being deaf or hard of hearing typically has little impact on the development of motor skills, fitness levels, and participation in sports. However, it is still important to accommodate students who are deaf or hard of hearing in the physical education setting.

Communicate using his or her preferred means of communication. When giving verbal instructions, make sure the student can see the instructors face clearly. Make sure you speak clearly and at a normal rate. Incorporate visual aids that have images or descriptive words. Repeat comments or questions made by the student's classmates. This helps all students alike. Check for understanding by asking students to repeat directions or demonstrate a skill. If an interpreter is involved, make sure to speak directly to the student, rather than the interpreter.

Visual impairments 
Children with visual impairments can play all of the same sports as their sighted peers, with some modifications. This may include a beeping ball or allowing blind player to walk around and feel the environment before they begin. Modifications can be made continuously until the best solution is found. Children with visual impairments and blindness may need more instruction and practice time to learn new concepts and movements. It is suggested that students receive pre-teaching before the start of a new unit. This can be done before school, after school, during orientation, or at home. Peer tutors may also be effective for students with visual impairments or blindness.

References

Further reading 
Cortiella, C.  (2005).  IDEA 2004 close-up: transition planning.  Retrieved May 6, 2010, from 
 
 
 Section 504 of the Rehabilitation Act of 1973, as amended, 29 U.S.C. 794.
 
 
 
 
 Sherrill, Claudine. Adapted Physical Activity, Recreation and Sport: Crossdisciplinary AndLifespan. Fifth Edition. N.p.: McGraw-Hill Companies, n.d. Print.
 

Physical education